Thylacodes natalensis, common name the solitary worm shell, is a species of sea snail, a marine gastropod mollusk, in the family Vermetidae, the worm snails or worm shells. The species was previously known as Serpulorbis natalensis.

References

Vermetidae
Gastropods described in 1862